Admiral M Farid Habib, (ND), NBP, OSP, BCGM, ndc (National Defence College), psc (Past Staff Course), (born 1959) was the 14th Chief of Staff of the Bangladesh Navy. He is the first ever four-star Admiral in the history of Bangladesh Navy.

Early life and training 
Farid Habib was born in 1959 at village Ichhapur in Kalihati Upazila of Tangail, East Pakistan. He is the youngest son of Late Mohammad Ali, ex Deputy Secretary to the Government.

He joined Bangladesh Navy Academy in 1976 as an officer cadet. He received basic naval training as Midshipman in Britannia Royal Naval College, Dartmouth, UK. After completing his training he was commissioned in the Executive Branch in Bangladesh Navy on 1 January 1979.

Vice Admiral Habib attended various professional courses both at home and abroad and obtained First Class in all the graded courses. The courses include Missile and Mine Sweeping Courses from China, Specialization on Navigation & Direction from Australia and Pakistan, Command and Staff Courses from Mirpur, Dhaka, Bangladesh and also from Newport, Rhode Island, USA. He attended National Defence Course and Capstone Course from National Defence College, Mirpur, Bangladesh Joint Warfare Course and Sea Safety Course in UK,. He obtained Masters in Defence Studies (MDS) from National University, Dhaka, Bangladesh with First Class. He also did Flag Officers Combined Force Maritime Component Commanders Course from Hawaii, USA.

Military career 
Admiral Habib commanded ships of all sizes, which include 3 Frigates, Large Patrol Craft, Mine Sweeper and Missile Boats during his career in the Navy, . As a specialized Navigator, he navigated ships to various countries like UK, China, Indonesia, Malaysia, Singapore, Sri Lanka and Pakistan. He served as Commandant, Bangladesh Naval Academy. He also served as Directing Staff and Colonel General Staff (Col GS) at Defence Services Command and Staff College, Mirpur, Dhaka, Bangladesh.

Prior to assumption of the command of Bangladesh Navy, Vice Admiral Habib was serving as Assistant Chief of Naval Staff (Operations) at Naval Headquarters since 1 July 2009. He held BN top command positions (Area Commanders) which include Commodore Commanding BN Flotilla, Commodore Commanding Khulna and Naval Administrative Authority, Dhaka. Besides, he served at Naval Headquarters as Assistant Chief of Naval Staff (Personnel), Naval Secretary, Judge Advocate General and important Directors at Naval Headquarters, including Director of Naval Operations and Director of Naval Plans. He also served as Director of Plans in Bangladesh Coast Guard. Besides these assignments, he performed the duties of Commissioner, Bangladesh Sea Scouts, and Member, National Executive Committee of Bangladesh Scouts, a non-political social organization.

He also performed the duties of chairman, National Hydrographic Committee, Bangladesh.

He was appointed as Chief of Staff of the Bangladesh Navy on 20 January 2013 and assumed office on 28 January 2013 . He has been promoted to the rank of Admiral on 17 January 2016. He left office on 27 January 2016.

Awards and recognition 
He has been awarded with the highest scouts award 'Silver Tiger' by the President of People's Republic of Bangladesh.

He received Commendation from the Chief of Naval Staff for outstanding performance and professional excellence in the Navy. He is also awarded with the highest achievement awards namely 'Bangladesh Navy Medal' and 'Bangladesh Coast Guard Medal' for outstanding contribution in different fields of Navy and Coast Guard.

Personal life 
He is married to Begum Hafiza Habib and has a close-knit family of one son and one daughter. He loves to pass his leisure in reading various periodicals and magazines. He plays cricket, lawn tennis and golf.

References

|-

Living people
1959 births
Chiefs of Naval Staff (Bangladesh)
Bangladeshi Navy admirals
National Defence College (Bangladesh) alumni